The fourth competition weekend of the 2019–20 ISU Speed Skating World Cup was held at the M-Wave in Nagano, Japan, from Friday, 13 December, until Sunday, 15 December 2019.

Medal summary

Men's events

 In mass start, race points are accumulated during the race based on results of the intermediate sprints and the final sprint. The skater with most race points is the winner.

Women's events

 In mass start, race points are accumulated during the race based on results of the intermediate sprints and the final sprint. The skater with most race points is the winner.

References

4
ISU World Cup, 2019-20, 4
2019 in Japanese sport
ISU